Schizoxylon is a genus of fungi within the family Stictidaceae.

References

Ostropales genera
Lichen genera
Taxa named by Christiaan Hendrik Persoon